Gerda Søgaard Weltz, née Pedersen (born 16 January 1951) is a former Danish female darts player.

Weltz is 3 times Danish single champion and a former winner of Denmark Open

She was picked 15 times for the national team, and continued as a national team manager after she stopped playing – until 2012 when she withdrew from the sport.

References
Wiking Masters resultats

Living people
Danish darts players
1951 births
People from Skive Municipality
Sportspeople from the Central Denmark Region